Polydrosos is a village and a community of the Delphi municipality. Before the 2011 local government reform it was a part of the municipality of Parnassos, of which it was a municipal district. The 2011 census recorded 1,125 residents in the village and 1,166 residents in the community. The community of Polydrosos covers an area of 38.672 km2.

History 
Signs of civilization in the area are going back in the early-Greek era (3rd millennium BC). After the destruction of some phocis cities and settlements from Philip II of Macedon, the ancient city of Lilaea merged with the near town of Erochus that was placed in the nowadays Polydrosos cemetery area.

Administrative division
The community of Polydrosos consists of three separate settlements: 
Ano Polydrosos (population 40)
Livadi (population 1)
Polydrosos (population 1,125)
The aforementioned population figures are as of 2011.

Population
According to the 2011 census, the population of Polydrosos was 1,166 people, a decrease of almost 5% compared to the previous census of 2001.

See also
 List of settlements in the Phocis regional unit

References

Populated places in Phocis
Villages in Greece
Mount Parnassus